Andrée-Anne Dupuis-Bourret is a Canadian artist. Dupuis-Bourret has multiple exhibitions in Canada as well as internationally. She is a tenured professor at the Université du Québec à Montréal.

Dupuis-Bourret is a recipient of the Governor General's Academic Medal.

References

External links
Université du Québec à Montréal profile
Official website

1978 births
Artists from Quebec
Academic staff of the Université du Québec à Montréal
Living people